Chris Moller may refer to:

 Chris Moller (architect), New Zealand architect
 Chris Moller (businessman), New Zealand businessman and sports administrator